The Daylight and Building Component Award is presented annually to an individual, or group of individuals, who have contributed significantly to the technical, social, artistic or design-related understanding of daylight. Previous awardees include architects, scientists, artists and building professionals, and the award carries with it a prize of 100,000 Euro. The award was established in 1980 and is given by the VELUX Foundation.

History
Upon its establishment in 1980, the Daylight and Building Component Award was given to Danish citizens who had made a significant contribution to the understanding and practical use of daylight. In the early years, this meant that many of the recipients were architects or artists, many of whom had worked with daylight in an architectural or design context.  Jørn Utzon, one of the most famous Danish Architects of the 20th century, was among the group awarded the first year. 
Through the next twenty-five years, the award was given intermittently,  often to larger groups of individuals. In 2006, the award was given to the father-son team of architects  Povl Wilhelm Wohlert and Claus Ditlev Wohlert.

In 2008, was converted to an annual award with four categories:
 Daylighting design
 Contribution to the science of daylighting
 Contribution to awareness or interest about daylighting.
 Contribution to the awareness of the industrial building component's importance, value and practical use in the everyday life

The monetary prize was also doubled in 2008 to 100,000 Euro, making it one of the largest of its kind within the  architecture  and   building communities worldwide.

In 2010, the award was given to American architect James Carpenter, whose recent projects include the design of 7 World Trade Center, the first building to be reconstructed at the site since Sept. 11, 2001.

The award is given around the first of March each year at a ceremony in Hørsholm, Denmark.

List of recipients

See also
 List of architecture prizes

References

External links and sources 
 The VELUX FOUNDATIONS
 Louisiana Museum of Modern Art
 Sydney Opera House
 The National Assembly of Kuwait
 Wohlert Arkitekter
 Utzon Center
 Hebsgaard Glaskunst
 Henning Larsen Architects
 James Carpenter Design Associates
 7 World Trade Center

Architecture awards
Architectural competitions